Nymphonidae is a family of sea spiders which has representatives in all the oceans. This family contains some 250 species, most of which are found in the genus Nymphon. Nymphonid bodies are between 1 and 15 mm long, the extent between the points of the legs reaching 150 mm. Most species are predators of hydroids. Like most sea spiders, species in this family have four pairs of legs, except for Pentanymphon antarcticum, which has five pairs, and Sexanymphon mirabilis, which has six pairs.

Taxonomy
Seven genera are currently recognized:

 Boreonymphon Sars, 1888 (4 species)
 Bradypallene Kim & Hong, 1987 (1 species)
 Heteronymphon Gordon, 1932 (8 species)
 Neonymphon Stock, 1955 (1 species)
 Nymphon Fabricius, 1794 (> 250 species)
 Pentanymphon Hodgson, 1904 (1 species)
 Sexanymphon Hedgpeth & Fry, 1964 (1 species)

Selected species
Nymphon gracile Leach, 1814
Nymphon brevirostre  Hodge, 1863
Nymphon hirtum  Kroyer, 1844

References

Pycnogonids
Chelicerate families